Osman III ( Osmān-i sālis;‎ 2 January 1699 – 30 October 1757) was the Sultan of the Ottoman Empire from 1754 to 1757.

Early life
Osman III was born on 2 January 1699 in the Edirne Palace. His father was Mustafa II and his mother was Şehsuvar Sultan. He was the younger half-brother of Mahmud I. When his father was deposed from the throne in 1703, he was taken back to Istanbul and imprisoned in the Kafes. Osman III lived in the Kafes for 51 years. 

He was secretly circumcised on 17 April 1705 with the other princes here. He was among the princes in Ahmed's entourage. He also later made trips to the sultan inside and outside the city.  Together with his elder brother Mahmud's embassy on 1 October 1730, he became the biggest prince waiting for the throne.

Reign
Osman III lived most of his life as a prisoner in the palace, and as a consequence, he had some behavioural peculiarities when he took the throne. Unlike previous sultans, he hated music, and banished all musicians from the palace. According to Baron de Tott, Osman III was an angry and modest type of ruler.

Osman III's first activity was to choose government officials to work with. During his reign, the changes he made in high-level government duties, especially Grand Vizier, can be considered as attempts to reduce the extremely weighted role of the charitable authority in the previous sultan's era.

In the severe storm of March 1756, an Egyptian galleon ran ashore in Kumkapı at dusk. Due to the storm, 600 passengers could not be evacuated.  The sultan, who came to the shore, took all the passengers by bringing barges from the shipyard.  He ordered the construction of the Ahırkapı Lighthouse in Istanbul to prevent such incidents. 

The first procession of his enthronement was held on 14 December 1754. The historians of that time didn't write the events happening in the empire because of severe and freezing cold of January 1755.  Osman was responsible for a firman in 1757 that preserved the Status Quo of various Holy Land sites for Christians, Muslims, and Jews.

In the second year of his reign, Osman lost his mother, Şehsuvar Sultan, who had been in contact with his religiousness. Afterward, the oldest prince, Mehmed, died of illness on 22 December 1756. According to various sources, the funeral of the prince, controlled by the quarry, grand vizier and sheikh al-Islam, was attended by 5,000 people. Some contemporary sources said that the prince was poisoned and killed on the initiative of Köse Mustafa Pasha, the next sultan of the third sultan, Köse Mustafa Pasha.

It is noted that, in this period, provisions were sent against banditry in Anatolia and Rumelia, and especially the movements of headless beams, and that the sultan was also interested in these issues. Some measures were taken against the tribes of Bozulus and Cihanbeyli, the Armenians due to the turmoil in Iran, the bandits around Erzurum and Sivas, and the famous leader Karaosmanoğlu Hacı Mustafa Ağa. The latter was captured and executed, and his head was brought to Istanbul on 5 December 1755.

Architecture
Osman is famous for building Nuruosmaniye Mosque, whose construction started during the reign of Mahmud I. Nuruosmaniye Complex, also known as Osmaniye for a while, consisted of three schools, madrasahs, a factory, a library, a mausoleum, a temporary room, a mesh house, a fountain, an inn, and shops. Osman built a new neighborhood in 1755-56 where Üsküdar Palace and Garden was located, along with houses and shops. He also built the Ihsaniye Mosque and its masjids, both of which stand today as İhsaniye.

Osman III built a fountain in his name in 1755–56; it was destroyed 122 years after its construction.

Death
Osman III died on the night of 30 October 1757.  In the early morning, a ceremony was held and his cousin Mustafa III was placed on the throne.  The new sultan ordered Osman to be buried in the New Mosque Mausoleum, not in Nuruosmaniye.

Family  
Osman III had three known consorts but no children, as did his elder half-brother Mahmud I. Sakaoğlu, a Turkish historian, speculates that the two may have suffered castration while imprisoned in the Kafes, but other historians point out that Osman III was 55 at the time of his rise and, unlike his brother, who had a long reign, he was on the throne for only three years before he died, and that both of these factors may have influenced the fact of not having children.  

The known consorts of Osman III are: 
 Leyla Kadın. BaşKadin (First Consort) of Osman throughout his reign. In 1757, a few months after Osman's death, she was married to Hacı Mehmed Emin Bey with whom she had a son, Feyzullah Bey. She died in 1794 and was buried in Üsküdar.
 Ferhunde Emine Kadın. She died in August 1791.
 Zevki Kadın. She sponsored several building renovations and built a fountain in Fındıklı, in the Turkish-Baroque style.

In popular culture
The Turkish metal band Pentagram wrote a song about him called Lions In A Cage.

References

Sources

External links

[aged 58]

1699 births
1757 deaths
People from Edirne
18th-century Ottoman sultans
Turks from the Ottoman Empire